The FA Challenge Cup, currently known as the Orange FA Cup or Orange Cup for sponsorship reasons, is the premier club football tournament in Botswana. Started in 1968 and first played as the Lions Cup, the tournament is based on the idea of giving lower league and amateur teams a chance to compete with top flight teams. It is based on the English FA Cup, which has become known for "giant killings" (lower league teams defeating top flight.

History
The tournament was started in 1968 as the Lions Cup. This name stayed in place until 1992 when the tournament was sponsored by Coca-Cola and was known as the Coca-Cola Cup.
The tournament was known as the Coca-Cola Cup until the sponsorship deal expired in 2012. However, it was not played for six years due to lack of sponsors. In 2018 it was sponsored by Orange and was renamed the Orange FA Cup or Orange Cup.

Sponsorship
The tournament was first sponsored in 1992. Below is a list of all the sponsors to date:
 1992–2012: Coca-Cola (Coca-Cola Cup)
 2013–2018: No sponsor
 2019: Orange (Orange FA Cup)

Format
Initially the tournament was played by a total of 64 teams. The tournament began with the qualifying rounds featuring Botswana Division One teams. Only 32 Division One teams progressed and faced off in the extra preliminary round, with the winners playing against the top 16 Botswana First Division teams in the preliminary round. Botswana Premier League teams entered directly in the first round (the round of 32) to face the winners of the preliminary round.
On 3 December 2018 it was announced that the tournament would now be played by 48 teams.
The premier league sides automatically qualify for the round of 32 whereas the top eight finishers from either First Division league face off with 16 Division One teams from regional playoffs. From the round of 32 onwards teams are not seeded. Games which end in a draw after 90 minutes plus added time are subject to extra time and penalties if necessary. The winner walks away with P700 000 ($70 000) and also qualifies to play in the CAF Confederation Cup, the African equivalent of the UEFA Europa League.

Past finals
1968: Gaborone United
1969: Not known
1970: Gaborone United
1971–1977: Not known
1978: Notwane
1979: Township Rollers
1980–1982: Not known
1983: Police 3–2 Mochudi Centre Chiefs
1984: Gaborone United
1985: Gaborone United
1986: Nico United (Selibe-Pikwe)  bt Gaborone United
1987: Nico United
1988: Extension Gunners
1989: Botswana Defence Force XI
1990: Gaborone United
1991: TASC 3–2 Botswana Defence Force XI
1991*: Mochudi Centre Chiefs (Mochudi) (3) bt (2) LCS Gunners   
1992: Extension Gunners 2–1 TAFIC
1993: Township Rollers 4–1 Gaborone United
1994: Township Rollers 2–0 Extension Gunners
1995: Notwane PG 2–0 Mokgosi Young Fighters
1996: Township Rollers 2–0 Botswana Meat Commission FC
1997: Notwane PG 2–0 Mokgosi Young Fighters
1998: Botswana Defence Force XI 1–0 Jwaneng Comets
1999: Mogoditshane Fighters 3–0 FC Satmos
2000: Mogoditshane Fighters 1–1 Gaborone United (aet, 5–4 pens)
2001: TASC 2–0 Extension Gunners
2002: TAFIC 0–0 TASC(aet, 6-5 pens)
2003: Mogoditshane Fighters 1–0 Township Rollers
2004: Botswana Defence Force XI 2–1 Mogoditshane Fighters
2005: Township Rollers 3–1 Botswana Defence Force XI (aet)
2006: Notwane 2–1 Botswana Defence Force XI
2007: Botswana Meat Commission FC 1–1 ECCO City Greens (aet, 6–5 pens)
2008: Mochudi Centre Chiefs 5–2 Uniao Flamengo Santos
2009: Uniao Flamengo Santos (Gabane) 1–1 Botswana Defence Force XI (aet, 4–2 pens)
2010: Township Rollers 3–1 Mochudi Centre Chiefs
2011: Extension Gunners 3–1 Motlakase Power Dynamos
2012: Gaborone United 0–0 Mochudi Centre Chiefs (aet, 4–2 pens)
2013–2018: Not played
2019: Orapa United 3–0 Township Rollers
2020: Gaborone United 3–0 Masitaoka (Molepolole)  
2021: Not held
2022: Gaborone United 2-1 Security Systems
NB* : 2 Lions Cup finals are reported for 1991, possibly one was for a 1990/91 season, the other for a (transitional) 1991 season

Results by team

Manager records

References

External links
RSSSF competition history

Football competitions in Botswana
Botswana